Osvaldas Matulionis (born August 19, 1991) is a Lithuanian professional basketball player for Fundación Lucentum Baloncesto of the LEB Oro. He plays at the small forward position. He played for Lietuvos rytas Vilnius youth system between 2007 and 2009.

Professional career
In 2013, Matulionis arrived to Spain to play at Força Lleida of the Spanish second division. Two years later, he agreed to terms with Cafés Candelas Breogán for one season.

On September 20, 2016, Matulionis signs a one-month contract with Río Natura Monbús Obradoiro for making his debut at Liga ACB.

On November 13, 2017, Matulionis was introduced at the Brazilian's champion Bauru Basket from NBB.

On July 19, 2018, Matulionis signed with RETAbet Bilbao Basket of the LEB Oro.

Awards and accomplishments

Club honours
Baltic Challenge Cup (1):
2012

Lithuanian national team
2007 FIBA Europe Under-16 Championship:

References

External links
 FEB profile

1991 births
Living people
Associação Bauru Basketball players
BC Lietkabelis players
BC Šiauliai players
Bilbao Basket players
Brussels Basketball players
CB Breogán players
Expatriate basketball people in Brazil
Força Lleida CE players
KK Pärnu players
Medalists at the 2011 Summer Universiade
Liga ACB players
Lithuanian expatriate basketball people in Estonia
Lithuanian expatriate basketball people in Spain
Lithuanian expatriate basketball people in Belgium
Lithuanian expatriate sportspeople in Brazil
Lithuanian men's basketball players
Obradoiro CAB players
Small forwards
Universiade bronze medalists for Lithuania
Universiade medalists in basketball